Psilocybe uxpanapensis is a species of entheogenic mushroom in the family Hymenogastraceae. The mushroom contains the hallucinogenic compounds psilocybin and psilocin. Mexican mycologist Gastón Guzmán described this mushroom in 1979 as a novel species: the first hallucinogenic mushroom to be discovered in an undisturbed tropical forest. Psilocybe uxpanapensis is one of the many tropical species of fungi in Mexico at risk of disappearing due to deforestation.

See also
List of psilocybin mushrooms
Psilocybin mushrooms

References

Entheogens
Fungi of Mexico
Fungi described in 1979
Psychoactive fungi
uxpanapensis
Psychedelic tryptamine carriers
Taxa named by Gastón Guzmán
Fungi without expected TNC conservation status